Sopron wine region is one of the seven larger wine regions of Hungary, consisting of only one wine region (Soproni borvidék). It is linked to the neighbouring Burgenland in Austria from a geographical, cultural and viticultural point of view. It is mainly a red wine-producing region, the main variety of which is Kékfrankos. Wine production dates back to Roman times.

Wine regions

References 

Wine regions of Hungary
Wineregion